Josaka is an independent record label and music company based jointly in Reading and London, England.

History
Josaka was founded in 1999 in order to host a presentation given by Kevin Harrington to a Gartner Group conference in Amsterdam.

For the next nine years, the domain josaka.com was used as a promotional platform for Berkshire-based bands, in the form of a forum.

In 2004, Josaka started an annual music showcase, held at Reading's South Street Arts Centre until 2006.  In 2007, the event moved to Reading's Plug 'n' Play venue for one year only.  The same year, Josaka became affiliated with the Reading leg of the Jail Guitar Doors charity.

Record label
In 2006, Josaka Music Limited was formed as record label and music management company.  The label's first release was in April 2006; a double a-side by Wire Jesus entitled "The Intruder/Another Day".

The following artists have released music through the Josaka label:

Ben Marwood
Quiet Quiet Band
Hello Wembley
Rebus
The Trouble With Me

To The Barricades
Tripwires
Wire Jesus
Secret Rivals
Sleep Room

References

British independent record labels

Internet properties established in 1999

Record labels established in 2006

Companies based in Reading, Berkshire
Culture in Reading, Berkshire
1999 establishments in England